Sirasa TV is a digital, terrestrial television network in Sri Lanka. It is the sister channel of 'TV One' (Previously MTV Channel and MTV Sports) which was established in 1992. Sirasa TV was started in 1998 as a sister to its radio network Sirasa FM. Sirasa TV is owned by the Sri Lankan business conglomerate, Capital Maharaja Group together with Gregson Holdings Ltd. Since then, another multi-national company - International Media Management - has also invested in MTV. It broadcasts its programs mainly in Sinhala.

Attacks

2009 New Year Attack and assassination
Fifteen masked gunmen stormed the studio and transmission complex, and destroyed the main control room of the group on 6 January 2009. Investigations revealed that a Claymore mine was used for the attack. Critics and observers linked the attack to the controversial reporting that was adopted in relation to the capture of Kilinochchi by Government Forces. Opposition political parties and associated media organizations accused the government of being responsible for the attack.

Teledramas

Reality TV Shows 

 Sirasa Lakshapathi (Who Wants to Be a Millionaire)
 Sri Lanka's Got Talent
 The Voice
 The Voice Teens 
 5 Million Money Drop 
 Sirasa Dancing Star
 Sirasa Film Star
 Sirasa Pentathlon
 Sirasa Junior Super Star
 Sirasa Kumariya
 Sirasa Platinum Awards
 Sirasa Superstar

Other popular programs
 Magic Seeya
 Api Nodanna Live
 Autovision
 Punchi Pahe Man
 Home Game in 60 second

Cartoons

References

External links
 Official website
 Sirasa TV LIVE

MTV Channel
Sinhala-language television stations
Television channels and stations established in 1998
1998 establishments in Sri Lanka
Mass media in Colombo